Indoor cycling, including cycle ball and artistic cycling, were part of the World Games in 1989.

Medalists

Cycle ball

Men

Artistic cycling

Men

Singles

Pairs

Women

Singles

Pairs

External links
 World Games at Sports123 by Internet Archive

Sports at the World Games
World Games